Del Amo Fashion Center is a three-level regional shopping mall in Torrance, California, United States. It is currently managed and co-owned by Simon Property Group.

The mall is anchored by Nordstrom, Dick's Sporting Goods, JCPenney, and two Macy's stores - a Women's store, and a Men's, Children's, and Home store.

History
Del Amo Fashion Center has evolved from an amalgamation of several developments on the eastern side of the intersection of Hawthorne Boulevard and Carson Street in Torrance, California by Guilford Glazer (#384 on Forbes Richest 400). From 1981 to 1992 it was the largest shopping mall in the United States, reaching  in size at its largest. It was eclipsed as the largest with the opening of Mall of America on August 11, 1992.

South side: Broadway/Del Amo Shopping Center
On February 16, 1959, The Broadway opened its store at Hawthorne and Sepulveda boulevards, the ninth in Greater Los Angeles, and over the next two years the open-air Del Amo Shopping Center was built adjacent to it, south of Carson Street. Silverwoods opened what was also its ninth L.A.-area store here in November 1960. Most of the rest of the center opened in stages in early 1961 with additional anchors JCPenney, Sears and Woolworth's. Other stores that opened in 1961 were Lerner's, Leed's Shoes and Ontra Cafeteria; and later C. H. Baker Shoes, Judy's Sportwear, Helen Morgan Women's Shop, The Men's Shop, Tot's Toggery and Suburban Shop, Singer Sewing Shop, Mandel's Shoes, Varon's Jewelry, and Children's Shoe Store.

North side: Bullock's/Del Amo Fashion Square
In 1966, Bullock's opened at a small open-air shopping center it had developed north of Carson Street called Bullock's Fashion Square — advertising and editorial in the first years referred to "Bullock's Fashion Square in Torrance", not Del Amo. Bullock's developed several similarly named Fashion Squares, including ones in Sherman Oaks, La Habra and Santa Ana. I. Magnin, owned by Bullock's, opened a store on March 6, 1967.

Desmond's department store was actually the first anchor to open at Fashion Square in 1966.

In February 1970, Federated Department Stores replaced its Bullock's Realty Corporation, which owned and managed the Fashion Squares, with an organization called Transwest Management; Transwest sold the Torrance Fashion Square in March of that year to new co-owners Great Lakes and Guilford Glazer and Associates, while selling the three other Fashion Squares to Urban Investment and Development Company (UIDC).

In 1971, the center was rebaptized Del Amo Fashion Square and added a $3.75 million,  Montgomery Ward, a  Ohrbach's and an expanded I. Magnin, as well as a United Artists fourplex theater which later received 2 additional larger auditoriums, and a Woolworth's, both of which were in the Montgomery Ward wing. Glazer acquired neighboring Del Amo Center in 1978.

"Marriage of the malls"
In November 1981, the two formerly separate centers were officially merged in the "marriage of the malls" to form the Del Amo Fashion Center, with the opening of a concourse over Carson Street that linked the Del Amo Fashion Square to a new J. W. Robinson's built at the northern end of the Del Amo Center. The existing infrastructure was also renovated at this time and included a food court (the "International Food Court") and a then-state-of-the-art computerized help system.  Del Amo became the largest indoor shopping center in the world.

The center continued to evolve over the years as Ohrbach's closed in 1987 and became Swedish style furniture retailer STØR. In 1991, the United Artists theater closed when a 9-screen Mann theater opened outside of the mall on Del Amo Circle to the east of J. W. Robinson's. When STØR went out of business in the early 1990s, the property was used as a clearance center for STØR merchandise before being subdivided into Marshall's and TJ Maxx in the late 1990s. I. Magnin followed in 1989 with part of their store eventually occupied by Old Navy, while Burlington Coat Factory opened in the basement of the former Del Amo Center. J. W. Robinson's became Robinsons-May in 1993.

In 1996, following the merger of Bullocks and The Broadway into Macy's West, the former Bullock's became Macy's Apparel store, while the Macy's south store (where the Broadway resided) was closed. At first, the company attempted to sell the building to Bloomingdale's, but after three years reopened it in July 1999 as a Macy's home and furniture gallery, its largest stand-alone home furnishing store in Southern California. The  ground floor became a Jo-Ann's fabric and crafts store. In 1997, Woolworth's became Venator in accordance with the chain's renaming.

Faced with a change in consumer shopping patterns, the consolidation of the department store industry, the existence of too many malls fragmenting the greater Los Angeles retail marketplace, lack of highway access and competition from the neighboring Nordstrom-anchored South Bay Galleria that opened in 1985, Del Amo began to suffer. In 2000, the Mann theater closed in accordance with the chain's folding and became LA Fitness. Two anchors on the property's northern side - Montgomery Ward and Woolworth's - closed due to bankruptcy and left the mall's north wing without an anchor. At the same time, a two-level Barnes & Noble bookstore opened on the mall's perimeter.

Mills renovation
In early 2002, The Mills Corporation acquired Del Amo Fashion Center from Glazer's family for $420 million (USD). Robinsons-May converted to a second full-line Macy's West on September 9, 2006 called Macy's South, while Macy's Apparel was renamed Macy's North.

The new open-air lifestyle center opened on September 14, 2006, anchored by a two-story flagship Forever 21), a Lucky Strike Lanes, and an AMC Theatres 18-screen multiplex to the mall. A Crate & Barrel home furnishings store opened adjacent to the mall in 2007.

In 2007, The Mills Corporation was jointly acquired by Simon Property Group and Farallon Capital Management. Simon assumed management of Del Amo Fashion Center at this time. In April 2008, the mall's website was placed under the Simon.com format along with sister Simon/Mills malls, like Ontario Mills, Hilltop Mall, the Block at Orange and Great Mall.

Simon expansion
After increasing its ownership stake in the property, Simon presented preliminary plans to revamp Del Amo. The plans were considered vague and underwhelming by Torrance residents.

In late 2012, detailed plans to redevelop Del Amo on a much larger scale were unveiled. These latest design efforts were led by Hollywood-based architecture firm, 5+design. The mall's north end would be demolished entirely, replaced by a new two-level Californian coastal-designed wing of luxury shops, expanding this mall into one of the largest malls in Southern California and back to the top 10 largest malls in the United States with the intention to stop the leaking of and to gain market share from the more affluent shopping centers in West LA (namely Westfield Century City and Third Street Promenade) and Orange County (namely the Irvine Spectrum, Fashion Island, and South Coast Plaza) In conjunction with the renovation, Nordstrom announced it would relocate its store from the South Bay Galleria in nearby Redondo Beach to Del Amo, anchoring the new wing. This much grander plan was meant to finally re-establish this property as the premier shopping center of the South Bay region of Los Angeles and revitalize this long-neglected, massive mall into one cohesive property with one distinct architectural style.

The first phase of the project, redeveloping the wing of shops above Carson Street into a new food court, renamed Patio Cafes, began in 2013. Work was completed in the spring of the following year, as retailers began vacating the north wing to make way for the renovation.

Plans to consolidate the mall's three Macy's stores into two were confirmed in 2014, with Macy's consolidating its standalone Macy's Home store into the existing Macy's Men's store. Simon then traded ownership of the Macy's Men's building for the Macy's Home building. Dick's Sporting Goods moved into the former Macy's Home space in early 2017 meanwhile the Jo-Ann Fabrics store on the ground floor of said began began renovation in early 2019 and completed in mid 2020.

After 18 months of construction, the northern portion of the mall officially opened on October 9, 2015. A medical building on the north end of the property and the existing one-story northern section were replaced with a two-story Fashion Wing, featuring a brighter and open "beach elegance" aesthetic to bring in more natural light and a mid-century modern look. The wing featured a mix of new-to-market retailers and holdovers from the former north end, including a Din Tai Fung restaurant and luxury retailers BOSS Hugo Boss, Kate Spade New York, Michael Kors, Tumi, and Brooks Brothers

Several new and relocated restaurants fronted the new wing: a relocated Lucille's Smokehouse Bar-B-Que, and now-closed locations for Brio Tuscan Grille and locally-owned restaurants EMC Seafood & Raw Bar and Great Maple.

The south end of the property experienced minor renovations in line with the more elaborate north end changes, including signs delineating the wing "Del Amo Shopping Center" with a focus on general-purpose retail. In 2018, renovation plans were completed to replace a significant portion of the south end's inline retail space with Dave & Buster's and a relocated Marshalls store. Outback Steakhouse, which was displaced by construction on the south end, reopened in the Outdoor Village on July 7, 2018.

In November 2019, the former Orbach's building, which previously housed Marshalls on the first floor and TJ Maxx on the second floor, became a Mitsuwa Marketplace supermarket. The second floor remains vacant after TJ Maxx left Del Amo in Spring 2016. The following year, the property's Sears store closed and its real estate purchased by mall owner Simon for future use.

As casualties of the COVID-19 pandemic-induced recession, and California statewide closures, the prototypical BRIO Tuscan Grille closed in mid-March, along with Guess, Me Undies, Innisfree, and New York and Company. On July 1, 2020, it was announced that Sears would be closing after nearly 61 years of serving the South Bay. This store along with 28 other stores nationwide shuttered on September 6, 2020. Said 22.4 acre Sears property (which includes the Original Sears Building, the branded auto shops, adjacent office building, and the surrounding parking lot) is set to be liquidated and bought by Simon Property Group by ~$110 million. Meanwhile, Fasha Mahjoor, who, in May 2014, bought the 16-acre property that SunCal once owned, intends to build housing near Del Amo Mall. Said property includes the standalone Black Angus Steakhouse restaurant, the former Montgomery Ward department store (now parking for Del Amo), and the abandoned Wards auto shop. However, Mahjoor announced that said project will not be "high-density housing at the mall", calling it a "political no-go".

Despite these closures, Italian retailer Intimissimi & Calzedonia opened a store in the new luxury wing in October 2020 while American burger restaurateur Slater 50/50 is set to open Spring 2023.

In January 2022, LA Fitness gym closed their doors. Around the same time, a Sweetgreen and a Keisuke Ramen King eatery is slated to replace the former Great Maple, which closed down in 2017.

In media
The Del Amo Fashion Center was a central location and plot element of the 1997 Quentin Tarantino film Jackie Brown, though most of the mall scenes took place at a fictional department store in the mall, called Billingsley, which was actually just the north Macy's store with a prop Billingsley sign put up over the Macy's sign. In addition, the mall was prominently featured in Martha Coolidge's Valley Girl, the mall's abandoned Montgomery Ward wing was used as the "Saguaro Square Mall" backdrop for the 2003 film Bad Santa with a fictional department store called Chamberlain's put up in the vacant Montgomery Ward building, and the mall was also used for scenes in the comedy film Why Him?. The mall was also used in Season 1, Episodes 2 and 3 of HBO series Euphoria.

The Barnes & Noble store located in the northwest parking lot of the mall was the location used for the chain's 2012 holiday TV ad.

Transit access

Torrance Transit as well as Los Angeles Metro operate to the Del Amo Fashion Center. Torrance Transit Rapid Line 3 and Local Lines 3, 6, and 7 operate along Carson Street. Los Angeles Metro Bus Line 344 and Torrance Transit Local Lines 4X and 8 operate along Hawthorne Boulevard.

See also
 List of largest shopping malls in the world
 List of largest shopping malls in the United States

References

External links 
Del Amo Fashion Center

Shopping malls in the South Bay, Los Angeles
Buildings and structures in Torrance, California
Economy of Torrance, California
Shopping malls established in 1961